The Samsung SGH-i300 is a discontinued smartphone developed by Samsung Electronics. Announced at CEBiT in March 2005, it was the world's first smartphone with an embedded hard disk, and was also Samsung's first Windows Mobile smartphone to be launched in the European Union. The code name of this smartphone project was Thor, which continued a trend in their series of smartphones with mythology-themed codenames such as Odin and Muse.

Specifications
 Windows Mobile 2003 (Smartphone)
 GSM tri-band (900/1800/1900)/GPRS class 10 
 3GB HDD embedded (i300X : 4GB HDD) 
 Region: Europe, South East Asia
 2.0" LCD
 Dual Speakers 
 IrDA/Bluetooth

References 

I300
Samsung smartphones
Mobile phones introduced in 2005
Mobile phones with infrared transmitter